ET Now is an English-language business and finance news channel in India, owned and operated by Bennett Coleman & Company Limited. It has evolved to also encompass the areas of Politics, Governance, Environment, Technology under its domain of coverage.

It is headquartered in Mumbai.

Editors and Anchors

Supriya Shrinate
In 2008, Supriya Shrinate joined ET Now as Chief Editor - News. She was named Policy Editor and Executive Editor for ET Now the same year. In 2019, she resigned from her post of executive editor in ET Now to contest 2019 Indian general election.

References

  

Television stations in Mumbai
Mass media in Mumbai
Business-related television channels in India
Business-related television channels
English-language television stations in India
24-hour television news channels in India
Television channels and stations established in 2009
Television channels of The Times Group
2009 establishments in Maharashtra
ET Now